The Other Side of the Looking Glass is the debut solo studio album by American hip hop musician Alias. It was released on Anticon in 2002. It features a guest appearance from Doseone.

Critical reception
Stanton Swihart of AllMusic gave the album 4.5 stars out of 5, saying: "There is a jittery, kinetic, midnight vitality to both the sound and sentiment expressed on this solo debut, yet Alias has an almost disarmingly serene way of wading through the mazes of his mind."

Track listing

Personnel
Credits adapted from liner notes.

 Alias – vocals, production, arrangement, recording, mixing
 Doseone – vocals (8)
 Ehren Whitney – saxophone (10)
 DJ Mayonnaise – production (10)
 Caleb Mulkerin – recording (10), mixing (10)
 Jonathan Wyman – mastering
 Thesis – artwork

References

External links
 

2002 debut albums
Alias (musician) albums
Anticon albums